Lions Love is a 1969 American drama film directed by Agnès Varda.

Cast 
 Viva - Viva
 Gerome Ragni - Jim 
 James Rado - Jerry
 Shirley Clarke - Herself
 Carlos Clarens - Himself
 Eddie Constantine - Eddie

Trivia
Both Ragni and Rado, the two male leads, were the lyricists and lead actors and singers for the 1968 musical Hair.

References

External links 

1969 drama films
1969 films
Films directed by Agnès Varda
American drama films
1960s English-language films
1960s American films